Biwanoki-ike is an earthfill dam located in Yamaguchi prefecture in Japan. The dam is used for irrigation. The catchment area of the dam is 0.2 km2. The dam impounds about 1  ha of land when full and can store 50 thousand cubic meters of water. The construction of the dam was completed in 1962.

References

Dams in Yamaguchi Prefecture
1962 establishments in Japan